Cherry Brook is a tributary of the West Dart River on Dartmoor, Devon, England.

Cherrybrook can also refer to:

Cherrybrook, New South Wales, Australia
Cherry Brook, Nova Scotia, Canada
Cherry Brook, Connecticut, United States

See also 
 Cherrybrook Kitchen, an American bakery